The National Museum of Aleppo is the largest museum in the city of Aleppo, Syria, and was founded in 1931. It is located in the heart of the northern city on Baron Street, adjacent to the famous Baron Hotel and near the Bab al-Faraj Square and Clock Tower. The majority of the museum's exhibitions are devoted to the archaeology of Syria, with most of the finds coming from archaeological sites of the northern part of the country.

Artefacts inside the museum were damaged in the 2023 Turkey–Syria earthquake.

History of the museum
In 1931, under the decision of the Syrian authorities, a small Ottoman palace was designated to become the National Museum in the city of Aleppo. After three decades, the building became too small to host the growing number of exhibited items. Therefore, it was decided in 1966 to demolish the old palace building and replace it with a larger, more modern structure. Construction of the new building commenced after Yugoslav architects Zdravko Bregovac and Vjenceslav Richter's project proposal won first prize for their competition entry.

In July 2016 the museum was hit by numerous missiles and mortar shells fired by rebel forces. This caused extensive damage to the roof and structure of the building.  Most of the collection had already been evacuated but concerns have been expressed regarding items which could not be moved.

Collections

Items from all historical periods are exhibited in the museum. However, the largest sections of the museum are devoted to the Iron Age and the Islamic period. The entrance to the museum is a temple gateway with a female sphinx from the Iron Age (9th century BC) Neo-Hittite settlement of Tell Halaf.

Ground floor
The ground floor consists of two sections: the section of Prehistoric Culture and the section of Ancient Syrian Civilizations.
The first section is a large hall containing numerous samples of human items and tools form the Stone Age found in the regions of Aleppo, Ain Dara and Ebla. It also contains the oldest civilized human shelter (8500 BC) brought from Mureybet.

The second section is divide into a group of halls, classified geographically according to the Syrian regions and dedicated to the ancient civilizations of Syria. Many Bronze Age objects from Hama and Ugarit are exhibited in the halls, statues and cuneiform scripts from Mari, as well as pieces discovered by Max Mallowan at the site of Tell Brak. Moreover, Iron Age materials and Assyrian style statues from archeological sites of the Al-Jazeera region, and the Euphrates region could be found.

The main halls of this section are:
The Hall of Al Jazeera Hills
The Hall of Mari
The Hall of Hama Region
The Hall of Ugarit
The Hall of Tell Halaf
The Hall of Arslan Tash
The Hall of Tell Ahmar
The Hall of Ancient Statues and Cuneiform Scripts.
The Hall of Ebla

Second floor
The upper floor of the museum contains three sections:
The section of Classical Remnants: Exhibits several objects of Greek, Hellenistic, Roman and Byzantine periods, such as coins, mosaics glassware and potteries.
The section of Arabic-Islamic History: This section contains several Arabic coins, manuscripts, potteries and an Islamic 12th-century tomb and a 12th-century astrolabe.
The section of Modern Art: Dedicated to the modern artists of Aleppo and other Syrian cities. It contains a scale model of the old city of Aleppo and a sixth-century fantastic mosaic.

Courtyard
The internal courtyard of the museum is home to huge basaltic statues of ancient Hittite and Roman mythological characters and a big third-century mosaic figure. At the external courtyard, monuments of Assyrian, Aramaic, Byzantine and Arabic civilizations are exhibited.

Gallery

See also

Deir ez-Zor Museum
National Museum of Damascus
 List of museums in Syria

References

Museums in Aleppo
Museums established in 1931
Archaeological museums in Syria
1931 establishments in Mandatory Syria
Museums of Ancient Near East in Syria
Buildings damaged by the 2023 Turkey–Syria earthquake